Jorge de Lancastre (English: George; 21 August 1481 – 22 July 1550) was a Portuguese prince, illegitimate son of King John II of Portugal and Ana de Mendonça, a lady-in-waiting to Joanna la Beltraneja.  He was created the second Duke of Coimbra in 1509. He was also master of the Order of Santiago and administrator of the Order of Aviz from 1492 to 1550.

Early life

Jorge de Lancastre was born in Abrantes on August 21, 1481, and raised by his aunt, the king's sister, Joan of Portugal, in the Convent of Jesus in Aveiro.  On Joan's death in 1490, Jorge was brought to the royal court, and was soon placed under the tutorship of monteiro-mor Diogo Fernandes de Almeida (the son of John II's late ally, Lopo de Almeida, Count of Abrantes).

Succession Campaign
After the death of the royal heir Prince Afonso in July 1491, King John II was left with no legitimate sons and no daughters he could marry off.  The next legitimate successor to the throne was his cousin (and brother-in-law), Manuel, 4th Duke of Beja and grand master of the Order of Christ since 1484.

This was a disturbing prospect for John II, who trusted neither Manuel nor the powerful Order of Christ.  During the purges of the high nobility in 1483–84, John II had ordered the execution of Manuel's own brother Diogo, Duke of Viseu and brother-in-law Fernando II, Duke of Braganza. Manuel himself only escaped a similar fate largely because John II regarded him as a harmless fool.  Now that 'fool' stood to succeed him, and in John II's estimation, would likely undo all the king's hard-won centralizing reforms and deliver the kingdom back to the nobles.

John II consequently launched a campaign to make his natural son, Jorge de Lancastre, his heir.  From Pope Innocent VIII, John II received authorization to appoint Jorge as Grand-Master of the Order of Santiago and administrator of the Order of Aviz, in April, 1492.  Only a few days later, Jorge's tutor, Diogo Fernandes de Almeida was appointed Prior of Crato (head of the Portuguese branch of the knights of St. John Hospitaller).

Meanwhile, Queen Eleanor set about knitting a rival campaign, in conjunction with the Order of Christ, to prevent Jorge's advancement and protect the position of Manuel (her brother) as heir.

In 1494, John II dispatched an embassy to Rome, headed by two members of the Almeida clan, to petition Pope Alexander VI to legitimize Jorge de Lancastre. The petition was rejected, bringing the campaign to a disappointing end.

John II, however, had no intention of just handing the kingdom over to Manuel's minions. In the will laid out just before his death in 1495, John II requested that Manuel appoint Jorge de Lancastre as Duke of Coimbra and Lord of Montemor-o-Velho and urged Manuel, on his accession, to pass all his other titles and possessions, including the mastership of the Order of Christ and the island of Madeira, over to Jorge.  The concentration of power would have made Jorge de Lancastre the most powerful man in the kingdom, reminiscent of his powerful great-grand-uncle Peter of Coimbra (a comparison suggested by John II himself).

Mindful of avoiding a civil war, Manuel agreed to many of the items in John II's will, but rejected others — notably, Manuel insisted on retaining the Order of Christ for himself. Manuel was not in a hurry to fulfill the rest of the terms.  The title of Duke of Coimbra was conferred on Jorge de Lancastre only in May 1500, and confirmation was delayed until May, 1509, nearly fifteen years after his father's death.

John II had also requested that young Jorge de Lancastre would be married to a royal princess, having Manuel promise his own first daughter, when they came of age.  Manuel only partly fulfilled this in 1500 by betrothing Jorge to Beatriz de Vilhena, the daughter of Álvaro of Braganza, not an infanta but nonetheless a princess of royal blood.

During Manuel's Reign

Most of the details of Jorge's subsequent life and career are marred by hagiographers of Manuel, eager to portray the king's rival in the worst possible light.  But far from the lazy and dissolute picture painted by the royal scribes, the chroniclers of the Order of Santiago seem to have regarded Jorge de Lancastre as a particularly diligent leader and administrator.

The Duke continued as an important figure in Portuguese politics, particularly in the first decade or so of Manuel's reign. The Order of Santiago was Jorge's principal power base. Jorge established something akin to an 'opposition' court at the Order's headquarters in Palmela. He gathered around him the principal loyalists of John II, who now became political opponents of King Manuel I of Portugal, notably the Almeida clan, the Ataíde family, and, of course, his mother's own family — notably, his uncle, António de Mendonça Furtado, a commendador of the Order of Aviz. Other opposition characters gathered around Jorge included Álvaro de Castro and Diogo Lopo da Silveira (Baron of Alvito), and notable India navigators Vasco da Gama and Francisco de Almeida. Jorge is also said to have had the support of many "New Christians", to have personally given them his protection and to have fought against the introduction of the Holy Inquisition into Portugal.

Jorge's party played a rather important role in the early India expeditions. They formed the 'pragmatic' party, insisting, like John II had, that the India expeditions were a commercial venture, a means for the enrichment of the treasury, a 'Renaissance' focus on wealth and power. Manuel's party had a more 'messianic' outlook, seeing the overseas expeditions through the Medieval goggles of Holy War and religious mission, coming up with schemes for two-pronged invasions of Egypt, marches on Mecca and the reconquest of Jerusalem. In this respect, Jorge (if not himself personally, certainly the party he led) played a vital role in keeping the India expeditions on a sane and viable track. Early India armada captains were drawn more from his party, than from Manuel's.

In the early years, Jorge's power was partly reliant on the hope that he might yet succeed Manuel, but that prospect diminished quickly as Manuel's new queen, Mary of Spain, produced a succession of sons. As time went on, his early fierce partisans began to slowly distance themselves and look for compromise and advancement with Manuel. For some, that meant leaving Jorge's Orders of Santiago and Aviz and passing over to Manuel's Order of Christ. Among those who made the switch were Francisco de Almeida and Vasco da Gama.

Jorge picked a particularly unfortunate fight with Vasco da Gama, once a loyal partisan.  After da Gama's glorious return from India in 1499, Manuel deftly promised the town of Sines as a reward to the admiral. But Sines was the property of the Order of Santiago.  Instinctively, Jorge was disposed to allow it, as a reward to one of his own; but since it was on the king's order, he feared it was the thin end of the wedge to more royal appropriations of Order properties. So he decided to make a stand on principle and stepped in personally to prevent it. He went so far as to secure the banishment of da Gama from Sines in 1507. This prompted da Gama to make his final break with Jorge, leave his beloved Order of Santiago and switch to the rival Order of Christ.

Jorge de Lancastre dedicated himself to defending his two knightly orders, Santiago and Aviz, from the unremitting poaching by Manuel's Order of Christ.  In May 1505, Jorge managed to secure a royal order prohibiting knights from leaving his orders without his express permission.  But Manuel soon obtained from Pope Alexander VI two bulls to undermine him — one from July 1505, giving the King of Portugal the right to dispose of the property of all three Orders; another in January, 1506, authorizing knights to move freely from other Orders to the Order of Christ.  However, Jorge continued to resist, and made a point of punishing knights who left without permission (for example, seizing the Sesimbra commenda of João de Menezes, Count of Tarouca, for having taken up the position of Prior of Crato without his consent).

In 1509, Jorge introduced a new set of rules for the Order of Santiago, overhauling its administration in a centralized fashion, bringing it closer in line with the rules of their Spanish brethren.

But with so many defections, Jorge found it hard to maintain his political footing, and his star was quickly waning. In 1516, the humiliation was complete when Manuel secured from Pope Leo X the authority to appoint Jorge's successors as grand masters of the orders of Santiago and Aviz.

Later Years

King Manuel died in late 1521, and was succeeded by his son, John III of Portugal. But the conflict with Jorge de Lancastre continued, the opposition standard taken up with more energy by Jorge's son, João de Lancastre, Marquis of Torres Novas. The sons of the old rivals butted heads politically and, increasingly, in the scandal sheets. In the late 1520s, João led the opposition to the marriage of King John III's brother, Infante Ferdinand, to Dona Guiomar Coutinho, a prominent noble heiress to the great feudal estates of Marialva and Loulé, on the grounds that he had already secretly married her. The King responded by locking up João de Lancastre in the Castle of São Jorge for some years (an episode later dramatized by Camilo Castelo Branco in his play O Marquez de Torres-Novas).

Jorge himself produced a notable scandal late in life when, at the age of 67, he pursued (and  married) a 16-year-old girl, Filipa de Melo (daughter of Dom Fernando de Lima). King John III gave great publicity to the scandal, while, behind Jorge's back, securing an annulment from the pope.

When Jorge de Lancastre finally died in late July 1550, John III moved quickly to seize control of the military orders. From Pope Julius III, he received a bull in August 1550 appointing him personally as the master of both the Order of Santiago and the Order of Aviz. This was followed up by a second bull, issued under great diplomatic pressure in December 1551, appointing the Kings of Portugal as masters in perpetuity of both military orders, thus bringing an end to the independence of the orders Jorge had fought so hard to retain.

At Jorge's death, John III took back the title of 'Duke of Coimbra' for the Crown. The official explanation was that Coimbra was a royal town and the existence of a feudal title bearing the town's name was inappropriate. The real reason was probably that the king was eager to erase a title that had been borne by two notable challengers of royal power, a name that might still have a magical pull on the imagination of the next bearer. The lands associated with the Duke of Coimbra were passed to the Duke of Aveiro, a new title created by John III shortly before (c. 1535) for Jorge's son and heir, João de Lancastre. The line of Lancastre would continue through the Dukes of Aveiro.

Marriage
In 1500, Jorge married Beatriz de Vilhena, daughter of Álvaro of Braganza, brother of Ferdinand II, Duke of Braganza.

Jorge had several children from his marriage with Beatriz de Vilhena:
 João de Lencastre, 1st Duke of Aveiro
 Afonso de Lancastre, Comendador-mor of São Tiago. He had a son:
 Álvaro of Lencastre, 3rd Duke of Aveiro
 Luís de Lancastre, Comendador-mor of Aviz, married Magdalena de Granada, granddaughter of Abu l-Hasan Ali, Sultan of Granada and Isabel de Solís
 Jaime de Lancastre, Prior of São Pedro de Torres Vedras, 1st General-inquisitor of the kingdom
 Helena de Lancastre, Comendadeira of the Royal Monastery of Santos
 Maria de Lancastre, religious in the Monastery of Saint John in Setúbal (Soror Maria Madalena)
 Filipa de Lancastre, prioress of the Monastery of Saint John in Setúbal
 Isabel de Lancastre, religious in the Monastery of Saint John in Setúbal and after that in the Royal Monastery of Santos.

He also had several illegitimate children.

Jorge died in the castle of Palmela on July 22, 1550.

Ancestry

See also
Duke of Coimbra
List of Portuguese Dukedoms

Bibliography

External links
Genealogical information on Jorge of Lancastre, 2nd Duke of Coimbra 

1481 births
1550 deaths
House of Aviz
102
Portuguese infantes
Illegitimate children of Portuguese monarchs
People from Abrantes
15th-century Portuguese people
16th-century Portuguese people
Sons of kings